Jacques Grenier (20 January 1823 – 5 March 1909) was a Canadian businessman and politician. He was mayor of Montreal.

Background

He was born in Berthierville.

Provincial
He was the Liberal candidate to the provincial legislature in the district of Montréal-Est in 1878, but lost against Louis-Olivier Taillon.

City Councillor
Grenier was a City Councillor in Montreal from 1857 to 1860, from 1861 to 1865, from 1872 to 1873 and from 1874 to 1889.  He resigned in 1889 to run for Mayor.

Mayor of Montreal
He was elected Mayor of Montreal in 1889, was re-elected in 1890, but was defeated in 1891.

After his death in 1909, he was entombed at the Notre Dame des Neiges Cemetery in Montreal.

References

Biography at the Dictionary of Canadian Biography Online

1823 births
1909 deaths
Businesspeople from Quebec
Mayors of Montreal
People from Lanaudière
Burials at Notre Dame des Neiges Cemetery